The Peruvian Guard Legion is a traditional military unit of Peru. It has participated in several conflicts since the country's independence and the unit's formation by José de San Martín in 1821. Its headquarters are located in the Real Felipe Fortress located in Callao.

History
The unit was established by José de San Martín with a decree published on August 18, 1821. It was the first military unit of the new self-proclaimed Peruvian state, and thus, the origin of the Peruvian Army. Its purpose was to uphold the independence proclaimed against the Viceroyalty of Peru, with its first commander being José Bernardo de Tagle. Englishman Guillermo Miller was responsible for organizing the unit and also served as a commander.

Later on it would see action in the War of the Confederation, the Chincha Islands War and the Ecuadorian–Peruvian War. The unit is currently part of the 2nd Army Division of the Peruvian Army.

See also
Hussars of Junín
Great Military Parade of Peru

References

Military units and formations of Peru
Military history of Peru
Guards of honour